Roberto Russo (born 27 February 1997) is an Italian volleyball player, a member of the Italy men's national volleyball team and Italian club Sir Safety Perugia.

Personal life
Russo wanted to become a football player. His uncle was a volleyball player who introduced him into volleyball.

Career
Russo signed his first club in 2014.

Club
 Club Italia Roma
 Consar Ravenna
 Sir Safety Umbria Volley

National team
In 2015 he was called up for the U19 national team and in 2016 for the U21 and U23 national team.

2018 was the year he first time to call for senior national team, with which he won, in the same year, the gold medal at the 2018 Mediterranean Games. He later won another gold at the 2022 world championship.

Awards

Club
 Italian Cup
2022–21 with Sir Safety Umbria Volley
Italian Super Cup
2019 with Sir Safety Umbria Volley
2020 with Sir Safety Umbria Volley
2022 with Sir Safety Susa Perugia

FIVB Club World Championship
  Brazil 2022 – with Sir Safety Susa Perugia

National team
Mediterranean Games
2018 Mediterranean Games –  Gold medal
FIVB Volleyball Men's World Championship
2022 FIVB World Championship –  Gold medal

Individual awards
2019–20 SuperLega – Best U23 Player

References

External links
Player profile at FIVB
Player profile at Volleybox
Player Profile at SuperLega

Living people
Italian men's volleyball players
1997 births